Emoia campbelli, also known commonly as Campbell's skink, the montane emo skink, and the Vitilevu mountain treeskink, is a species of lizard in the family Scincidae. The species is endemic to the island of Viti Levu in Fiji.

Etymology
The specific name, campbelli, is in honor of geologist John Campbell who collected the holotype.

Habitat

Behavior
E. campbelli is arboreal, living in the forest canopy, and sheltering in epiphytic myrmecophytes (ant plants).

Reproduction
E. campbelli is oviparous.<ref name="iucn status 18 November 2021"/ Clutch size is two eggs, which are laid in the chambers of ant plants.

References

Further reading
Adler GH, Austin CC, Dudley R (1995). "Dispersal and speciation of skinks mong archipelagos in the tropical Pacific Ocean". Evolutionary Ecology 9: 529–541.
Brown WC, Gibbons JRH (1986). "Species of the Emoia samoensis group of lizards (Scincidae) in the Fiji Islands, with descriptions of two new species". Proceedings of the California Academy of Sciences 44 (4): 41–53. (Emoia campbelli, new species, pp. 49–51, figure 3).
Morrison, Clare (2003). A Field Guide to the Herpetofauna of Fiji. Suva, Fiji: Institute of Applied Sciences, University of the South Pacific. 121 pp.
Zug GR (1991). "The lizards of Fiji: Natural history and systematics". Bishop Museum Bulletin in Zoology 2: 1–136.

Emoia
Reptiles described in 1986
Taxa named by Walter Creighton Brown
Taxa named by John Richard Hutchinson Gibbons